Tyler Perry (born Emmitt Perry Jr., September 13, 1969) is an American actor, filmmaker, playwright, and entrepreneur. He is the creator and performer of the Madea character, a tough elderly woman. Perry's films vary in style from orthodox filmmaking techniques to filmed productions of live stage plays. Many of his stage-play films have been subsequently adapted as feature films.

Perry wrote and produced many stage plays during the 1990s and early 2000s. He also developed several television series, most notably Tyler Perry's House of Payne, which ran for eight seasons on TBS from 2006 to 2012.  In 2011, Forbes listed him as the highest-paid man in entertainment, earning US$130 million between May 2010 and May 2011. In 2012, Perry struck an exclusive multi-year partnership with Oprah Winfrey and her Oprah Winfrey Network (OWN). The partnership was largely for the sake of bringing scripted television to OWN, based on Perry's previous success in this area. Perry has created multiple scripted series for the network, The Haves and the Have Nots crime drama being its most successful. The Haves and the Have Nots gave OWN some of its highest ratings during its 8-year series run, the program hailed as "one of OWN's biggest success stories with its weekly dose of soapy fun, filled with the typical betrayals, affairs and manipulations."

Perry has also acted in films not directed, written or produced by himself, including as Admiral Barnett in Star Trek (2009), the titular character in Alex Cross (2012), Tanner Bolt in Gone Girl (2014), Baxter Stockman in Teenage Mutant Ninja Turtles: Out of the Shadows (2016), Colin Powell in Vice (2018), Arthur in Those Who Wish Me Dead (2021), and Jack Bremmer in Don't Look Up (2021). Perry has also done voice acting for animated films such as The Star (2017) and PAW Patrol: The Movie (2021).

Perry was included in Time's list of the 100 most influential people of 2020. In 2020, he was awarded the Governors Award from the  Primetime Emmy Awards and the following year, he received the Jean Hersholt Humanitarian Award from the Academy Awards. In 2022, he was inducted into the Black Music & Entertainment Walk of Fame.

Early life
Tyler Perry was born Emmitt Perry Jr. in New Orleans, Louisiana, to Willie Maxine Perry (née Campbell) and Emmitt Perry Sr., a carpenter. He has three siblings. Perry's childhood was described in retrospect as a "living hell". In contrast to his father, his mother took him to church each week, where he sensed a certain refuge and contentment. At age 16, he had his first name legally changed from Emmitt to Tyler in an effort to distance himself from his father.

Many years later, after seeing the film Precious, Perry was moved to reveal for the first time that he had been molested by a friend's mother at age 10; he was also molested by three men prior to this and later learned his own father had molested his friend. A DNA test taken by Perry indicated that Emmitt Sr. was not Perry's biological father.

While Perry did not complete high school, he earned a General Educational Development (GED). In his early 20s, watching an episode of The Oprah Winfrey Show, he heard someone describe the sometimes therapeutic effect the act of writing can have, enabling the author to work out his or her own problems. This comment inspired him to apply himself to a career in writing. He soon started writing a series of letters to himself, which became the basis for the musical I Know I've Been Changed.

Career

Stage
Around 1990, Perry moved to Atlanta, where two years later I Know I've Been Changed was first performed at a community theater, financed by the 22-year-old Perry's $12,000 life savings. The play included Christian themes of forgiveness, dignity, and self-worth, while addressing issues such as child abuse and dysfunctional families. The musical initially received a "less than stellar" reception and was a financial failure. Perry persisted, and over the next six years he rewrote the musical repeatedly, though lackluster reviews continued. In 1998, at age 28, he succeeded in retooling the play and restaging it in Atlanta, first at the House of Blues, then at the Fox Theatre. Perry continued to create new stage productions, touring with them on the so-called "Chitlin' Circuit" (now also known as the "urban theater circuit") and developing a large, devoted following among African-American audiences. In 2005, Forbes reported that he had sold "more than $100 million in tickets, $30 million in videos of his shows and an estimated $20 million in merchandise", and "the 300 live shows he produces each year are attended by an average of 35,000 people a week".

Film
Perry raised a US$5.5 million budget in part from the ticket sales of his stage productions to fund his first movie, Diary of a Mad Black Woman, which went on to gross US$50.6 million domestically, while scoring a 16% approval rating at the film review web site Rotten Tomatoes. Perry made his directorial debut on his next film, an adaptation of Madea's Family Reunion, and has directed all of his subsequent Madea films. On its opening weekend, February 24–26, 2006, Madea's Family Reunion opened at number one at the box office with $30.3 million. The film eventually grossed $65 million. Perry and his co-stars promoted the film on The Oprah Winfrey Show.  As with Diary, almost all of the Madeas earnings have been generated in the United States.

Perry's next Lionsgate project, Daddy's Little Girls, starred Gabrielle Union and Idris Elba and was released in the United States on February 14, 2007. It grossed over US$31 million. Perry wrote, directed, produced and starred in his next film, Why Did I Get Married?, released on October 12, 2007. It opened at number one, grossing US$21.4 million that weekend. It is loosely based on his play of the same name. Filming began March 5, 2007, in Whistler, British Columbia, a resort town north of Vancouver, then moved to Atlanta, where Perry had opened his own studio. Janet Jackson, Sharon Leal, Jill Scott, and Tasha Smith appeared in the film. Perry's 2008 film, Meet the Browns, released on March 21, opened at number 2 with a US$20.1 million weekend gross. The Family That Preys opened on September 12, 2008, and grossed over US$37.1 million.

Madea Goes to Jail opened at number one on February 20, 2009, grossing US$41 million and becoming his largest opening to date. This was Perry's seventh film with Lionsgate Entertainment. At the request of director J. J. Abrams, also in 2009, Perry had a small role as the Starfleet Academy commandant Admiral Barnett in Star Trek, which opened on May 8. This was his first film appearance outside of his own projects.
Perry next wrote, directed, and starred in I Can Do Bad All By Myself (2009), a film structured around his Madea character. This was Perry's eighth film and it also made number one at the box office. In 2009, Perry teamed with Oprah Winfrey to present Precious, a film based on the novel Push by Sapphire.
Why Did I Get Married Too?, the sequel to Why Did I Get Married?, opened in theaters on April 2, 2010. It featured Janet Jackson,  Tasha Smith,
Jill Scott, and Malik Yoba. The film grossed US$60 million domestically, with US$29 million made the opening weekend.

Perry directed a film adaptation of Ntozake Shange's 1975 choreopoem For Colored Girls Who Have Considered Suicide When the Rainbow Is Enuf, which was released in theaters November 5, 2010.
He appeared in the stage show Madea's Big Happy Family, which toured the U.S. as a stage play and was released as a movie in 2011, written, directed by and starring Perry. The film version of Madea's Big Happy Family raked in US$25.8 million at the box office, taking second place. Perry's next film with Lionsgate was Good Deeds, in which Perry plays lead character Wesley Deeds. Good Deeds is a romantic drama film written, directed by, and starring Perry. The film was released on February 24, 2012. It is the tenth of eleven films that Perry directed and appears in. The film received a 29% rating by review aggregator Rotten Tomatoes and opened with a box office US$15.5 million gross. The movie also stars Thandie Newton, Rebecca Romijn, Gabrielle Union, Eddie Cibrian, Jamie Kennedy, Phylicia Rashad, and others.

, Perry's films had grossed over US$500 million worldwide. Perry's Madea's Witness Protection, his seventh film within the Madea franchise, was released on June 29, 2012.

Perry took over the role of James Patterson's Alex Cross from Morgan Freeman for a new film in the series, titled Alex Cross. The film which opened on October 19, 2012, was panned by critics and audiences, with Rotten Tomatoes scores of 11% & 47% positive respectively, and became a box office bomb. His performance gained the attention of director David Fincher, who subsequently cast Perry in his 2014 thriller Gone Girl, co-starring with Ben Affleck, Rosamund Pike, and Neil Patrick Harris.

Perry released his thirteenth film, Temptation: Confessions of a Marriage Counselor (based on his 2008 play of the same name) on March 29, 2013. The film stars Lance Gross, Jurnee Smollett, Brandy Norwood, Robbie Jones, Vanessa L. Williams, and Kim Kardashian. He produced Tyler Perry Presents Peeples, released on May 10, 2013. He returned to the big screen with A Madea Christmas, released on December 13, 2013. Perry directed the film The Single Moms Club, which opened on March 14, 2014. His first animated movie Madea's Tough Love was released on DVD January 20, 2015. In 2016, Perry played scientist Baxter Stockman in Teenage Mutant Ninja Turtles: Out of the Shadows. In mid-January 2016, Perry started filming his seventeenth film, and ninth within the Madea franchise, Boo! A Madea Halloween. The film was released on October 21, 2016. A sequel, Boo 2! A Madea Halloween, was released in October 2017. Perry, alongside Oprah Winfrey, lent his voice in his first computer-animated film, called The Star, which is based on the Nativity of Jesus. Developed by Sony Pictures Animation, the film was released on November 17, 2017.

Film partnerships and distribution
Perry's films are co-produced and distributed by Lions Gate Entertainment; he retains full copyright ownership under the corporate name Tyler Perry Films, and places his name in front of all titles. Perry's movies have seen very limited release outside North America, but in May 2010, Lionsgate announced plans to begin releasing his films in the United Kingdom.

Television programs
Perry produced the long-running sitcom Tyler Perry's House of Payne, which ran for 8 seasons from June 21, 2006, to August 10, 2012. The series followed an African-American household of three generations. The show demonstrated the family members' serious, true-to-life struggles with faith and love. The show ran in the spring of 2006 as a 10-show pilot. After the successful pilot run, Perry signed a US$200 million, 100-episode deal with TBS. On June 6, 2007, the first two episodes of Tyler Perry's House of Payne ran on TBS. After receiving high ratings, House of Payne entered broadcast syndication. Reruns were played through December 2007 before the second season began. Perry also wrote, directed and produced the sitcom Meet the Browns, which premiered on TBS on January 7, 2009 and ended on November 18, 2011.

OWN and partnership with Oprah
On October 2, 2012, Perry struck an exclusive multi-year partnership with Oprah Winfrey and her Oprah Winfrey Network (OWN). The partnership was largely for the purposes of bringing scripted television to OWN, Perry having had previous success in this department.

Tyler Perry's For Better or Worse, based on his films Why Did I Get Married? and Why Did I Get Married Too?, premiered on TBS on November 25, 2011. The series was cancelled by TBS in February 2013 but was revived by OWN for a third season, which began on September 18, 2013.

Perry also had two other television series featured on OWN: the hour-long soap opera/drama series The Haves and the Have Nots and the sitcom Love Thy Neighbor. The Haves and the Have Nots premiered on May 28, 2013, and completed its series run after 8 seasons on July 20, 2021. The program was credited by Oprah Winfrey as bringing success to her network and opened the door for a host of other highly rated dramas to OWN. During its series run, The Haves and the Have Nots had numerous Nielsen rating highs for the OWN broadcasting station: it was reported on May 29, 2013, that The Haves and the Have Nots set a new record for OWN, scoring the highest ratings ever for a series premiere on the network. Love Thy Neighbor scored the second highest ratings ever for a series premiere on OWN, behind The Haves and the Have Nots. Contrastingly, however,
Love Thy Neighbor had struggled in ratings. The Have and the Have Nots remained the network's highest rated program for most of its run. On February 4, 2014, The Haves and the Have Nots came in as the most watched program in all of cable television for the night. On March 11, 2014, a Haves and the Have Nots season 2 episode set an OWN record when it scored the highest ratings in the network's history. The record-breaking episode brought in 3.6 million viewers, surpassing the 3.5 million that tuned in for the Oprah's Next Chapter interview with Bobbi Kristina which was the network's previous highest rated viewing.

On January 9, 2014, as part of Perry's continued partnership with OWN, the network ordered its fourth scripted series (and fourth series by Perry) based on the feature film, The Single Moms Club, called If Loving You Is Wrong. The hour-long drama series premiered on September 9, 2014.

Tyler Perry Studios

In 2015, Perry acquired the 330-acre former military base Fort McPherson located in Atlanta, which he converted to studios. The studios were used to film the HBO Films/OWN film version of The Immortal Life of Henrietta Lacks, and is currently in ongoing use for the television series The Walking Dead. 50,000 square feet of the site are dedicated to standing permanent sets, including a replica of a luxury hotel lobby, a White House replica, a 16,000-square-foot mansion, a mock cheap hotel, a trailer park set, and a real 1950s-style diner that was relocated from a town 100 miles away; it also hosts 12 sound stages named after highly accomplished African-Americans in the entertainment industry. The blockbuster Marvel film, Black Panther, was the first to be filmed on one of the new stages at Tyler Perry Studios as announced personally by Perry on his Instagram account on February 19, 2018.

Tyler Perry Studios is one of the largest film studios in the nation and established Perry as the second African-American to outright own a major film studio, after Tim and Daphne Reid.

ViacomCBS
On June 14, 2017, Perry signed a long-term deal with Viacom (now ViacomCBS) for 90 episodes/year of original drama and comedy series. Viacom will also have distribution rights to short video content and a first look at film concepts (the first film from this deal was Nobody’s Fool). The TV deal began fall 2019 with The Oval, Sistas and BET+ (a brand new streaming service) premiering with strong ratings for BET.

Books

Perry's first book, Don't Make a Black Woman Take Off Her Earrings: Madea's Uninhibited Commentaries on Love and Life, appeared on April 11, 2006. The book sold 30,000 copies. The hardcover reached number one on the New York Times Best Seller list and remained on the list for 12 weeks. It was voted Book of the Year, Best Humor Book at the 2006 Quill Awards.

His second book, Higher Is Waiting, was published on November 14, 2017. It debuted at number 5 on the New York Times Best Seller list.

Legal actions

The Writers Guild of America, West
The Writers Guild of America, West filed unfair labor practice charges with the National Labor Relations Board (NLRB), alleging that Perry's production company, Tyler Perry Studios, unlawfully fired four writers in October 2008 in retaliation for them trying to get a union contract. The dispute was settled a month later, when Tyler Perry Studios agreed to be a WGA signatory.

Mo' Money Taxes
In early 2009, Perry threatened legal action against Mo' Money Taxes, a tax preparation company based in Memphis, Tennessee, for running a TV spot that he felt offensively parodied his work, in particular Madea Goes to Jail. The ad features a large white male (John Cowan) in drag, named "Ma'Madea". The offending ad was dropped from circulation.

Reception

Criticisms
Despite praising Perry in 2006, director Spike Lee criticized his work in 2009, stating "Each artist should be allowed to pursue their artistic endeavors but I still think there is a lot of stuff out today that is 'coonery buffoonery'." When asked if Perry's success among black audiences was a result of just giving black America what they wanted, Lee responded, "the imaging is troubling."

In an open letter to Perry on National Public Radio, journalist Jamilah Lemieux, while thanking Perry for "giving black folks jobs in front of and behind the camera," also criticized his shows Meet the Browns and House of Payne. In her letter, she stated that "both your shows are marked by old stereotypes of buffoonish, emasculated black men and crass, sassy black women." While she noted his work for its humor and "positive messages of self-worth, love and respect," she later expressed frustration that African-Americans "have been fed the same images of ourselves over and over and over because they sell." Lemieux dismissed his famous Madea character, claiming that "Through her, the country has laughed at one of the most important members of the black community: Mother Dear, the beloved matriarch. ... Our mothers and grandmothers deserve much more than that." While she expressed appreciation toward Perry for dismissing critics' negative comments, Lemieux claimed that "many black folks have expressed some of the very same attitudes about your work that white critics have," and urged him to "stop dismissing the critics as haters and realize that black people need new stories and new storytellers."

On January 6, 2020, Perry posted a video on Instagram in which he revealed that he doesn't use a writers room for his films and TV shows and prefers to write his work himself. Perry received criticism from several outlets and figures in entertainment for denying opportunities to up-and-coming black writers. Later that month, Perry responded in an interview by stating that he had experienced issues when working with both WGA writers and nonunion writers. He claims that the WGA writers would submit "scripts that would need rewrites in order to get paid multiple times." He also said that nonunion writers struggled to meet his standards of quality and that he "was unhappy with every single script they wrote" because "they were not speaking to the voice."

Response
In October 2009, during a 60 Minutes interview, Perry was read a quote of Spike Lee's comments about his work and responded, "I would love to read that [criticism] to my fan base. ... That pisses me off. It is so insulting. It's attitudes like that that make Hollywood think that these people do not exist, and that is why there is no material speaking to them, speaking to us." Perry also stated that "all these characters are bait – disarming, charming, make-you-laugh bait. I can slap Madea on something and talk about God, love, faith, forgiveness, family, any of those." In an interview with Hip Hollywood, Perry responded to Spike Lee's comments by telling him to "go to hell."

Acclaim
Perry's work has been praised by Oprah Winfrey, who joined Perry in promoting Lee Daniels' film Precious (2009). She told an interviewer, "I think [Perry] grew up being raised by strong, black women. And so much of what he does is really in celebration of that. I think that's what Madea really is: a compilation of all those strong black women that I know and maybe you do too? And so the reason it works is because people see themselves."

Goldie Taylor, of The Grio and MSNBC, stated in an April 21, 2011 NPR All Things Considered interview regarding Perry's target audience: "I don't think Tyler Perry is talking to Touré. I don't think he's talking to me, but I know that he's speaking directly to my mother, my sister, my cousins and meeting them at their point of need, and that's what art and filmmaking is about."

In his Huffington Post editorial, sociologist Shayne Lee lists Perry among the pantheon of today's most innovative filmmakers.

Parodies and satire
In the American Dad! episode "Spelling Bee My Baby", Steve Smith deliberately misspelled his words in a spelling bee so as to express his love for Akiko (who was also competing), instead spelling random Tyler Perry and Madea films.

Perry was satirized by South Park in the Season Fifteen episode "Funnybot". He was given an award for "Person most likely to actually show up to receive their Kathy Griffin Award" and the black characters in the episode, Tolkien Black and President Obama, express their own disbelief that they can't stop watching his comedy and giving him money. At the end of the episode Perry, as Madea, is buried and encased in steel with Obama's declaring, "I am pleased to announce that the greatest threat to mankind has now gone forever. Justice has been done."

Tyler Perry as Madea was parodied in The Boondocks episode "Pause", in which a thinly disguised version of Perry named Winston Jerome played a similar character to Madea dubbed "Ma Dukes." The parody had the "Ma Duke" character running a homosexual cult.

Tyler Perry was also parodied in The Cleveland Show episode "A Brown Thanksgiving" in which Auntie Momma is really Donna Tubbs's Uncle Kevin. In another episode, Donna receives a bottle of wine called "Tyler Perry Presents Wine", a play on his movie titles.

Perry was lampooned by Donald Glover in his FX series Atlanta in the episode Work Ethic! in 2022.

Personal life
Perry is good friends with Janet Jackson, Will Smith and Oprah Winfrey.

Perry is a Christian.  Many of the themes in his work reflect theology and social behavior indicative of the predominantly black church culture, such as the many scenes in both his stage and screen work that feature church settings and worship styles commonly found in predominantly African American churches, including showcases of gospel music and artists.

In 2007, Perry bought a 17-acre estate in the Paces neighborhood of Buckhead, Atlanta. In May 2016, he sold the house for $17.5 million, also closing the biggest deal ever for a private home in the Georgia capital.

On July 20, 2009, Perry sponsored 65 children from a Philadelphia day camp to visit Walt Disney World, after reading that a suburban swim club, the Valley Swim Club in Huntingdon Valley, Pennsylvania, had shunned them. He wrote on his website, "I want them to know that for every act of evil that a few people will throw at you, there are millions more who will do something kind for them."

On December 8, 2009, Perry's mother, Willie Maxine Perry, died at age 64, following an illness. He lives and works in Southwest Atlanta where he operates the Tyler Perry film and TV studios. In August 2010, it was reported that he had purchased Dean Gardens, a 58-acre estate in the Atlanta suburb of Johns Creek. He tore down the existing  mansion and planned, but never built, a new, environmentally-friendly home on the property.

On November 30, 2014, Perry's partner Gelila Bekele gave birth to their son. In December 2020, Perry announced that he was a single bachelor.

In September 2017, Perry purchased a house in Mulholland Estates, a gated community in Los Angeles. Nine months after buying the estate, Perry sold the property for $15.6 million.

Perry owns vacation properties in both Wyoming and the Bahamas.

On March 7, 2021, Prince Harry, Duke of Sussex and Meghan, Duchess of Sussex publicly revealed in the television interview Oprah with Meghan and Harry that Perry provided initial security and housing for three months that allowed the couple to safely relocate from Canada to California in March 2020, following the withdrawal of their British royal protection. Perry is also godfather to their daughter, Princess Lilibet of Sussex.

Following the death of Stephen "tWitch" Boss, Perry uploaded a video to his Instagram account where he spoke about his own struggles with depression, and revealed he had attempted suicide several times before his career took off.

Filmography

Film work

Television work

Stage work

Accolades

See also
 Tyler Perry Studios
 Disappearance of Terrance Williams and Felipe Santos – Tyler Perry offered a $200,000 reward for information in the case and has worked to raise publicity for the case.

References

External links

 
 
 
 

 
1969 births
20th-century American male actors
21st-century American male actors
21st-century American male writers
21st-century American non-fiction writers
21st-century American novelists
African-American businesspeople
African-American billionaires
African-American Christians
African-American dramatists and playwrights
African-American film directors
African-American film producers
African-American male actors
African-American male comedians
African-American novelists
African-American screenwriters
African-American songwriters
African-American television directors
African-American television producers
American billionaires
American Christian writers
American Christians
American dramatists and playwrights
American humorists
American film producers
American male comedians
American male dramatists and playwrights
American male film actors
American male non-fiction writers
American male novelists
American male screenwriters
American male songwriters
American male television actors
American male television writers
American Protestants
American television directors
American television writers
Christian novelists
Comedians from Georgia (U.S. state)
Comedians from Louisiana
Gospel music composers
Living people
Male actors from Atlanta
Male actors from New Orleans
Novelists from Georgia (U.S. state)
Novelists from Louisiana
Songwriters from Georgia (U.S. state)
Songwriters from Louisiana
Television producers from Georgia (U.S. state)
Writers from Atlanta
Writers from New Orleans
African-American comedians